Acleris holmiana, the golden leafroller moth, is a moth of the family Tortricidae. It is found in most of Europe and Asia Minor.

The wingspan is about 10–15 mm. The forewings are suboblong, deep orange -ferruginous, yellower towards dorsum anteriorly, suffusedly streaked transversely with pale violet, sometimes mixed posteriorly with whitish and blackish scales. Tufts are absent and there is a triangular white often black-edged costal blotch beyond middle. The cilia are  ochreous-yellowish, on tornus dark grey. The hindwings are grey, darker posteriorly. The larva is yellowish with a pale brown head. Julius von Kennel provides a full description.

Adults are on wing from July to August. There is one generation per year.

The larvae feed on a various rosaceous trees and shrubs including Crataegus, Rubus, Pyrus, Prunus, Cydonia, Rosa and Malus. They spin two leaves together and feed within. Larvae can be found from May to June. Larvae cause minor damage to the leaves but infestations on cultivated plants are usually unimportant.

References

holmiana
Tortricidae of Europe
Moths of Asia
Moths described in 1758
Taxa named by Carl Linnaeus